This was the first edition of the event.

Diego Sebastián Schwartzman won the title, defeating Andreas Beck in the final, 6–7(4–7), 6–3, 6–2.

Seeds

  Denis Kudla (first round)
  Blaž Rola (withdrew)
  Diego Sebastián Schwartzman (champion)
  Horacio Zeballos (first round)
  Pierre-Hugues Herbert (first round)
  João Souza (first round)
  Andreas Beck (final)
  Marc Gicquel (first round)
  Ruben Bemelmans (second round)

Draw

Finals

Top half

Bottom half

References
 Main Draw
 Qualifying Draw

Open du Pays d'Aix - Singles
2014 Singles